Esperándote (English title: Waiting for you) is a song by Colombian singer Manuel Turizo released in 2017.

Background
"Esperándote" was written by Juan Diego Medina, Manuel Turizo, Julian Turizo, Santiago Mesa, Carlos Cossio, Christian Mesa and his producer KZO.

Commercial performance
In Colombia, "Esperándote" peaked the number seven.

In Mexico, the song peaked the number 17.

In Spain, the song peaked the number 43.

In United States, the song peaked the number 39 at Hot Latin Songs, the number 21 at Latin Airplay and the number thirteen at Latin Pop Airplay.

"Esperándote" was certified 4x Platinum by Asociación Mexicana de Productores de Fonogramas y Videogramas (AMPROFON), gold by Productores de Música de España (PROMUSICAE) and double platinum by Recording Industry Association of America (RIAA).

Charts

Certifications

References

2017 singles
2017 songs
Manuel Turizo songs
Spanish songs
Spanish-language songs